Kurkent is a rural locality (a selo) in Suleyman-Stalsky District, Republic of Dagestan, Russia. The population was 4,071 as of 2010. There are 30 streets.

Geography 
Saidkent is the nearest rural locality.

References 

Rural localities in Suleyman-Stalsky District